Liotella pulcherrima is a species of minute sea snail, a marine gastropod mollusc in the family Skeneidae.

Description
The diameter of the shell attains 1.4 mm. The thin, colorless and transparent shell is flat-coiled. It consists of three whorls, the body whorl rounded and rapidly descending. The suture is moderately deep. The whole surface is distinctly cancellated. The spiral striae are very minute and close together, with 30–50 on the body whorl. The longitudinals are much thicker and wider apart. The umbilicus is wide and deep. The aperture is round, with an entire margin that is not thickened. The thin peristome is continuous.

Distribution
This marine species is endemic to Australia and occurs off New South Wales and Victoria.

References

 Seashells of New South Wales: Liotella pulcherrima
 Cotton, B. C., 1959. South Australian Mollusca. Archaeogastropoda.  W.L. Hawes, Adelaide.. 449 pp., 1 pl.

External links
 Natural History Museum Rotterdam: Liotella pulcherrima

pulcherrima
Gastropods of Australia
Gastropods described in 1894